The Illmoor Chronicles is a series of fantasy books for children written by English author David Lee Stone. The books are all set in the world of Illmoor, a fictional continent.

The first book, The Ratastrophe Catastrophe was released in June 2003. The latest book is The Coldstone Conflict.

Books
The Illmooor Chronicles consists of six books: The Ratastrophe Catastrophe, The Yowler Fowl-Up, The Shadewell Shenanigans, The Dwellings Debacle, The Vanquish Vendetta, and The Coldstone Conflict. David Lee Stone is not currently working on an Illmoor Seven,  as he is working on a new project called Davey Swag.

The Ratastrophe Catastrophe
The Ratastrophe Catastrophe was released in June 2003.

The Ratastrophe Catastrophe is the first book The Illmoor Chronicles. In the book, a simple young boy named Diek Wustapha, who becomes possessed by dark magic early in the story and finds that he has the power to charm people and animals alike with the tune of his flute. Soon becoming bored of his life in the town of Little Irkesome, Diek journeys around Illmoor, looking for a use for his newly acquired talents.

In Dullitch, capital city of Illmoor, the current ruler, Duke Modeset, is facing a severe problem. The city is infested with rats, large rats, and lots of them, too. The resident rat-catchers have long since given up, and the situation is grave. The chairman of the Dullitch Council, Tambor Forestall, who was a wizard before he gave up magic for politics when sorcery was outlawed on Illmoor long ago, has sent heralds to hire mercenaries to solve the Dullitch rat infestation.

One of the heralds, young Jimmy Quickstint, grandson of Tambor, who only works as a herald part-time; he is actually a trainee member of the Rooftop Runners, a group of organised thieves in Dullitch, finds the barbarian mercenaries Groan Teethgrit, the giant, bald mountain of muscle, and Gordo Goldeaxe, a one-eyed dwarf equipped with a lethal axe and an even deadlier supply of sarcasm. After being informed that all the other mercenaries on the list are dead or dismembered, Jimmy heads back to Dullitch with the intrepid barbarian pair, who completely fail to solve the rat problem.

Meanwhile, another herald stumbles upon Diek in the town of Crust, and promptly puts his name on the list and brings him back to Dullitch. Once there, Diek convinces Duke Modeset that he is able to get rid of the rat infestation for a price far lower than what the Duke was planning to pay the barbarians.

Parodying the Pied Piper, Diek charms the rats with his flute and leads them to a nearby jetty and drowns them all. As he goes to collect his reward from the Duke, he finds that the Dullitch Treasury lacks the funds to pay him. Enraged, he leaves the Treasury and is convinced by a voice in his head- the magic possessing him– that he should have his revenge on all of Dullitch. He then charms the city's children in the same way.

The citizens of Dullitch, bewildered at the sudden disappearance of the children of the city, decide that Duke Modeset is a good scapegoat. They surround the palace, trapping him inside, but not before he gives Jimmy Quickstint a couple of hundred crowns down-payment to give to the barbarian mercenaries, as well as Tambor, who has joined the pair and returned to his sorcerer roots, to bring the children of Dullitch back and kill Diek. Unfortunately, the horse Jimmy is riding runs off with the money and he is stuck in the middle of the Carafat Jungles, but soon finds a secret entrance to the catacombs of the mountains known as the Twelve, where he meets a stranger named Stump, who claims to have seen Diek come into the catacombs with the children.

Jimmy and Stump travel further into the Twelve, where they meet Tambor, Groan and Gordo, who have also found their way into the Twelve as they were held prisoner by an angry giant. The group, motivated by the prospect of saving the children of Dullitch from Diek, as well as by the prospect of money, decide to attack Diek, whose mind has been totally consumed by dark magic, when they find him deep in the Twelve.

In the battle that follows, Tambor opens a portal known as the Doorway of Death, a way into the limbo, as Groan distracts Diek. Unfortunately, Diek manages to push Tambor into his own Doorway, and as a furious Groan hurls Diek bodily into the portal, the Doorway of Death closes, sealing their fates. Meanwhile, as Jimmy and Gordo manage to free the children from their prison, Stump falls into a hole and disappears.

The remaining three lead the children safely back to Dullitch, where they are rewarded in separate ways. Groan and Gordo are drugged and thrown into jail, and Jimmy is kicked out of the Rooftop Runners for being brave and honourable. Duke Modeset is exiled from Dullitch, and his cousin, Viscount Raviss Curfew, is to be the next lord of Dullitch.

The Yowler Fowl-up
A terrible sect has arisen in Illmoor - they're dark, they're deadly and they're even more hellbent on the destruction of the city than the citizens themselves. All that stands between total chaos and the return of the dark gods are Duke Modeset (who doesn't like the place anyway), Jareth Obegarde (a vampire on his mother's side) and Jimmy Quickstint (who is about to do the wrong favour for the wrong man).

A thrilling story of darkness and destiny, where the brave step forward...and fall over.

-Blurb on back cover.

"sublime humour...wonderfully tongue in cheek..." (Manchester Evening News)

The Shadewell Shenanigans
The Shadewell Shenanigans was released on 5 June 2005.

This book is centered around the characters of Groan Teethgrit, a barbarian, his partner in crime Gordo Goldeaxe, a dwarf, and his half brother Gape, who first appears in this book. Gordo and Groan are notorious criminals well known for looting banks of Illmoor. The lords of the great cities of Illmoor need to devise a plan to get rid of Groan, Gape and Gordo, but cannot do so openly as the duo are also known and admired for saving the children of Dullitch from the clutches of an evil sorcerer during the events of the first Illmoor book, The Ratastrophe Catastrophe.

Having no other choice, the lords of Illmoor turn to Duke Vandre Modeset, disgraced noble and exiled Lord of Dullitch, ruler of his ancestral town of Fogrise, for help against the notorious criminals. Modeset reveals his elaborate plan to use the princess of Phlegm, Susti as bait to lure the trio to their deaths. King Phew of Phlegm then publicly announces that he will be holding a tournament to choose a husband for Susti, who is far from happy about the role she is playing in Modeset's scheme.

Groan and Gape, unable to resist the lure of riches and a beautiful woman, enter the competition. They both get an audience with the princess for a night each, and then compete in the arena by killing goblins, trolls and the like. This ends in a draw.

Eventually, Princess Susti makes a speech, stating that the brothers must prove their devotion to her by obtaining four priceless items, namely, the Idol of Needs on Kazbrack, an island off the east coast of Illmoor inhabited by fire demons, Ezra's Opal, which belongs to Lady Khan, wife of Mad Count Craven, the zombie ruler of Wemeru the undead city in the voodoo jungles of Rintintetly, Pagoda's Box, a treasure chest in the Finion Finger Mountains guarded day and night by harpies, and the jewelled eyes of Torche, a giant dragon in the Fastrush Pass. These legendary items are, in fact, non-existent, made up by Modeset. However, the dangers that each of the four places possess are all too real.

The three clueless adventurers decide to work together. They decide to travel to the nearest location, Wemeru, to find Ezra's Opal. They arrive at an inn, where they try to rent a carriage and end up fighting and knocking out a gangster named Loogie Lambontroff, who is the nephew of Count Craven. They decide to take him along, in case he is useful in the future. When Loogie wakes, it is revealed that he is a twinling, which means that when he is angry, he morphs into a dangerous and murderous version of himself. Two fights with Loogie end up with the gangster getting decapitated. The trio are even more shocked when Loogie's severed head speaks and informs them that since he is a zombie by birth, his head is still sentient.

Meanwhile, Princess Susti has discovered Modeset's dastardly plot to trap and kill the Teethgrit brothers and sets out to warn them of their impending doom. However, Modeset catches up to her and captures her. When he arrives back at Phlegm, he makes a drastic decision and takes over Phlegm with the soldiers of the city, who have no loyalty to King Phew whatsoever. Modeset doesn't realise that Stump, a character from the first Illmoor book, has been eavesdropping on the whole situation and has left to tell Groan and Gape.

Loogie tells the group that Lady Khan was stolen from him by his uncle Craven, and that Lady Khan is actually a chicken, and finds the idea that she owns Ezra's Opal absurd. Nevertheless, they storm the city of Wemeru and fend off the zombie hordes while Loogie, angered at the sight of his uncle, transforms into the twinling, and strangles the Count.

After confirming that Lady Khan is indeed a zombie chicken, Loogie, who used to be a geography student, asks about the other three artifacts and says that he has never heard of the items. Gordo feels that they have been tricked, but Groan and Gape suggest checking Kazbrack, the next nearest location, for the Idol of Needs. They find a flying machine in the central pyramid of Wemeru and Loogie tells them how to operate the device. They fly to Kazbrack, but are viciously shot at by fire demons. They retreat quickly and crash into the River Washin, but not before Gape is burned by a fire demon.

They then find Stump, who recognises Groan and Gordo from their adventures together in The Ratastrophe Catastrophe and tells them about Modeset and his plan. Enraged at being tricked and still angry about being imprisoned by Modeset, they march back to Phlegm, but on the way are attacked by three of Loogie's gangster bosses on a barge, who have heard that Loogie was knocked unconscious by the barbarian brothers. One of them shoots Stump in the shoulder and swim ashore to fight the rest of them. After a tough battle, the gangsters, Mr Big, Mr Mediocre and Mr Titch, are defeated, and the group now have access to the weapons and armour available on the barge before attacking Phlegm.

As Groan, Gordo and Gape attack the doors of Phlegm, Stump, who has recovered from his shoulder wound, helps out from afar as he is good with a bow and arrow, with Loogie acting as his second pair of eyes. When the doors of Phlegm are breached, the terrified Phlegmian soldiers immediately surrender and they rush up onto the wall, where Modeset is confronted by King Phew and Princess Susti, who have escaped from the dungeons with the help of Modeset's manservant Pegrand Marshall, who has fallen for Susti. Weapons are drawn and pointed at each other, with Modeset pointing a gun at Groan and his raised broadsword, and Gape's twin swords poised to strike General Crikey, leader of the Phlegmian soldiers who has a crossbow. Groan agrees to lower his sword, but Modeset thinks better of it and shoots him twice. The first shot rebounds off Groan's metal collar and hits Modeset in the face, knocking him into Phlegm Keep's shark-infested moat. The second shot hits his thigh, knocking him out. Gape, seeing this, hurls both swords at Crikey, killing him.

Meanwhile, outside the Keep, Stump has fallen into a hole, just as he has done twice before, taking Loogie with him. On the wall of the Keep, Susti suggests a way to end the conflict without any other blood being spilled and offers to make Groan the King of Phlegm. Groan and Phew both agree and Groan becomes King, Gordo becomes the new chief of the Phlegmian guard and Gape becomes Phlegm's chief of trade.

King Groan and Pegrand, the new Duke of Fogrise, meet up with the other lords of Illmoor and state that Phlegm is withdrawing from the Great Assembly. The story ends mysteriously as Modeset's body is not found in the moat, and he previously mentions to Pegrand having swum in his father's shark-infested lagoon as a boy without being attacked by the creatures. His funeral is held a year later, and King Groan's first son is born during this time.

The Dwellings Debacle
A dark enemy is about to make its presence felt in Dullitch...something even more twisted and evil than the citizens themselves. But for Enoch Dwellings, famed investigator, it's a golden opportunity to shine. Unfortunately, the vampire detective next door has the same idea, and he never bites off more than he can chew.

There may be trouble ahead...

The Vanquish Vendetta
An evil impostor sits on the Dullitch throne, posing as Viscount Curfew. With bodies dropping left and right, suspicions are aroused. But it's nothing the Royal Society of Lantern Collectors can't handle...

Meanwhile, King Groan Teethgrit is broke. A plan to flog an ancient hammer leads him, his brother and Gordo Goldaxe back to Dullitch, where once again, they help make a bad situation so much worse.

The Coldstone Conflict
The evil Vanquish has returned to Illmoor and none can stand against him. To make matters worse, Illmoor's greatest hero is now a walking, talking, killing vessel of darkness. With two of the continent's other greatest heroes dead and only a pitiful band of crusaders fighting for freedom

Hope is fading fast...

And yet there is one - ancient and powerful enough to challenge the dark god - who might step up to the task. Unfortunately, he's only interested in staying forgotten.

Can Illmoor unite to face its greatest enemy yet?

Fantasy novel series
Series of children's books
British fantasy novels
Children's fantasy novels